Parliamentary elections were held in Cuba on 11 January 1998 alongside elections to the fourteen Provincial Assemblies. A list of 601 candidates for the 601 seats was provided by the National Candidature Commission. Voter turnout was reported to be 98.35%.

Results

References

Cuba
Parliamentary elections in Cuba
Parliamentary election
One-party elections
Single-candidate elections
Cuban parliamentary election
Election and referendum articles with incomplete results